Wooderson is a rural locality in the Gladstone Region, Queensland, Australia. In the  Wooderson had a population of 188 people.

History 
Wooderson State School opened on 23 August 1945 and closed in 1960.

In the  Wooderson had a population of 188 people.

References 

Gladstone Region
Localities in Queensland